Umsaskis Lake is a lake on the Allagash River in the North Maine Woods region of Maine.

The lake is on the Northern Forest Canoe Trail.

External links

Lakes of Aroostook County, Maine
Allagash River
North Maine Woods
Northern Forest Canoe Trail
Lakes of Maine